The Sredny Stog culture (romanized: Serednʹostohivsʹka kulʹtura) is a pre-Kurgan archaeological culture from the 5th-4th millennia BC. It is named after the Dnieper river islet of today's Seredny Stih (Sredny Stog), Ukraine, where it was first located.

Distribution

The Serednii Stih culture was situated across the Dnieper river along its shores, with sporadic settlements to the west and east. 

It seems to have had contact with the agricultural Cucuteni–Trypillian culture in the west, centered in modern-day Moldova, Romania and Ukraine , and was a contemporary of the Khvalynsk culture in the north-east, located in the middle Volga region.

Sites
The Eneolithic part of the Deriivka archaeological complex includes a settlement and a cemetery. Other Serednii Stih sites include Igren-8 and Molukhiv Bugor on the Dnieper River, as well as Oleksandia on the Oskil River in east Ukraine.

Characteristics
The Serednii Stih people lived rather mobile lives. This was seen in their temporary settlements, particularly their dwellings, which were simple rectilinear structures.

Dmytro Telegin has divided the chronology of Serednii Stih into two distinct phases. Phase I (middle 4th millennium BC, according to Telegin) included Serednii Stih complexes of the Strilcha Skelia-Serednii Stih II type that contained pottery without the corded ornament. Phase II (according to Telegin, middle 3rd millennium BC) is represented by the Serednii Stih complexes of the Deriivka-Moliukhiv Buhor type that used corded ware pottery which may have originated there, and stone battle-axes of the type later associated with expanding Indo-European cultures to the West. Most notably, it has perhaps the earliest evidence of horse domestication), with finds suggestive of cheek-pieces (psalia). However, there is no conclusive proof that those horses were used for riding since they were mainly employed for gathering food. Phase I is now dated to the middle 5th millenium BC and Phase II - to the late 5th-first half of the 4th millennium BC. Serednii Stih periodization has also undergone a revision in recent years.

Burials
In its three largest cemeteries, Oleksandria (Alexandria in Russian) (39 individuals), Igren (17) and Deriivka II (14), evidence of burial in flat graves (ground level pits) has been found. This parallels the practice of the Cucuteni-Trypillia culture, and is in contrast with the later Yamnaya culture, which practiced tumuli burials.

In Serednii Stih culture, the deceased were laid to rest on their backs with the legs flexed. The use of ochre in the burial was practiced, as with the kurgan cultures. For this and other reasons, Yuri Rassamakin suggests that the Serednii Stih culture should be considered as an areal term, with at least four distinct cultural elements co-existing inside the same geographical area.

Language
In the context of the modified Kurgan hypothesis of Marija Gimbutas, this pre-kurgan archaeological culture could represent the Urheimat (homeland) of the Proto-Indo-European language. Others associate this with the later Yamnaya culture.

Physical type
Examination of physical remains of the Serednii Stih people has determined that they were Europoid. A similar physical type prevails among the Yamnaya, who were tall and powerfully built. People of the neighboring Khvalynsk culture were less powerfully built. People of the preceding Dnieper–Donets culture were even more powerfully built than the Serednii Stih and Yamnaya.

Genetics

Mathieson et al. (2018) included a genetic analysis of a male buried at Olexandria (Ukraine) and dated to 4153-3970 calBC, ascribed to the Serednii Stih culture. He was found to be carrying the paternal haplogroup R1a1a1, and the maternal haplogroup H2a1a. He carried about 80% Western Steppe Herder (WSH) ancestry and about 20% Early European Farmer (EEF) ancestry. This Seredny Stig male was thought to be the first steppe individual found to have been carrying EEF ancestry. As a carrier of the 13910 allele, he was supposed to be the earliest individual ever examined who has had a genetic adaptation to lactase persistence. However, the recent publication  by  David Reich Lab, October 2021, presented another date from a different sample of the same individual, 2134–1950 cal BC, which could actually belong to Srubnaya culture period, as Haplotree Information Project considers this sample I6561 is from around 3650 ybp (c. 1700 BC), and belongs to Y-DNA R1a-F2597*, corresponding to R1a-Y3.  The WSH genetic cluster was a result of mixing between Eastern Hunter-Gatherers (EHGs) from Eastern Europe and Caucasus hunter-gatherers (CHGs). This mixing appears to have happened on the eastern Pontic–Caspian steppe starting around 5,000 BC.

A preprint by Matilla et al. (2022) presented whole-genome analysis of a Serednii Stih individual, dated to 4320-4052 calBC, from the Deriivka II archaeological site in the Middle Dnieper Valley. The authors conclude that a third of the genetic ancestry of the individual was derived from the local Neolithic Dnieper Valley ancestry, while the rest was of the Yamna-related steppe ancestry.

Another Eneolithic individual (4049-3945 calBC) carrying steppe ancestry, potentially from a Serednii Stig population, was identified at the Trypillian settlement of Kolomyitsiv Yar Tract (KYT) near Obykhiv in central Ukraine. At the whole genome level, the KYT individual was close to the Yamna from Ukraine and Russia, without forming a clade with Yamna. The authors suggested that genetic ancestry of the KYT individual was plausibly derived from a proto-Yamna population, with admixture from Iron Gates Mesolithic. 

The steppe ancestry, otherwise known as Western Steppe Herder WSH ancestry, found in the Seredny Stih culture is similar to that of the Khvalynsk culture, among whom there was no EEF admixture. Males of the Khvalynsk culture carried primarily the paternal haplogroup R1b, although a few samples of R1a, I2a2, Q1a and J have been detected. Succeeding Yamnaya males however, have been found to have carried only R1b and I2. This is similar to the males of the Dnieper-Donets culture, who carried R and I only and were almost exclusively EHGs with Western Hunter-Gatherer (WHG) admixture. The results suggest, as a possible yet highly simplified scenario, that the Yamnaya emerged through mixing between EHG and WHG males, and EEF and CHG females. This implies that the leading clans of the Yamnaya were of EHG paternal origin. On this basis, David W. Anthony argues that the Indo-European languages were originally spoken by EHGs. Another hypothesis about the origin of the Indo-European (IE) languages links them with the Eneolithic circum-Pontic trade network and suggests the emergence of the ancestral IE tongue in the North Pontic steppe.

Recent genetic research found the Yamnaya to be a result of admixture between EHGs, CHGs, Anatolian Neolithic farmers and Levantine Neolithic farmers, with the mixture happening between an EHG + CHG population (Serednii Stih-like) and a CHG-like (CHG + Anatolia Neolithic + Levant Neolithic) population with the admixture occurring around 4000BCE.

Successors
The culture ended at around 3500 BC, when the Yamnaya culture expanded westward replacing Serednii Stih, and coming into direct contact with the Cucuteni–Trypillia culture culture in western Ukraine.

Notes

References

Sources 
 
 
 
 
J. P. Mallory, "Sredny Stog Culture", Encyclopedia of Indo-European Culture, Fitzroy Dearborn, 1997.
 

Archaeological cultures of Eastern Europe
Chalcolithic cultures of Europe
Archaeological cultures in Ukraine
Archaeological cultures in Russia
History of Zaporizhzhia